Jack A. Brown (May 2, 1929 – October 28, 2015) was an American rancher and politician.

Born in St. Johns, Arizona, Brown received his bachelor's degree in agriculture and economics from Brigham Young University. Brown participated in the real estate business. Brown served in the Arizona House of Representatives from 1963–1974, 1987–1996 and from 2004–2010. He also served in the Arizona State Senate from 1999 to 2004 and was a Democrat.

Brown was an active member of the Church of Jesus Christ of Latter-day Saints. He served as a missionary for the Church in Brazil from 1948–1951. He also served as a bishop over a ward of the Church.

Notes

1929 births
2015 deaths
People from St. Johns, Arizona
Brigham Young University alumni
Ranchers from Arizona
Democratic Party members of the Arizona House of Representatives
Democratic Party Arizona state senators
Latter Day Saints from Arizona